Busselton Jetty is the longest timber-piled jetty (pier) in the Southern Hemisphere at  long. The jetty is managed by a not-for-profit community organisation, Busselton Jetty Inc.

The jetty's construction commenced in 1864 and the first section was opened in 1865. The last commercial vessel called at the jetty in 1971 and the jetty was closed the following year. It passed into the control of Busselton Shire and has been gradually restored and improved since. The jetty has survived Cyclone Alby in 1978, borers, weathering, several fires, and the threat of demolition, to have become a major regional tourist attraction.

The jetty features a rail line along its length, a relic of the railway line into Busselton from Bunbury. The line now carries tourists along the jetty to an underwater observatory, one of only six natural aquariums in the world, which opened to the public in 2003. A new observatory, the Australian Underwater Discovery Centre,

History

Early history
In 1839 Governor Hutt appointed "the place in Geographe Bay opposite the Settlement at The Vasse to be the legal place for the loading and unloading of goods". Construction of the jetty – originally known as the Vasse Jetty – commenced in 1864 after persistent pressure by settlers, among others timber merchant Henry Yelverton and magistrate Joseph Strelley Harris; Yelverton's company was awarded the tender for construction. In 1865 the first section, approximately 176 metres, of the jetty became available for ships to moor. In 1875 an additional 143 metres was added to the original structure, as over 10 years' accumulation of drift sands had made the water too shallow for mooring. Fires on the jetty were commonplace, with some attributed to fishermen carelessly disposing of burning cigarettes, dropping lit matches or to sparks falling from the train's fire box.

Closure
Even while the port was operating commercially, maintenance costs were controversial. The last commercial ship visited the jetty on 17 October 1971. On 21 July 1972, the jetty was closed to shipping by Governor's Proclamation in the Western Australian Government Gazette after more than a century of use. Once closed, government maintenance of the jetty ceased and it began to deteriorate, suffering attack by wood borers, rot and the occasional fire.

Cyclone Alby
On 4 April 1978, Cyclone Alby swept south down the Western Australian coast from the North-West (a rare occurrence) and destroyed a large part of the shore end of the jetty. Subsequently, townspeople banded together to try to save the jetty and eventually persuaded the State Government and the Shire Council to provide some much needed funds for repair.
Rebuilding the timber jetty proved expensive and funds soon ran out. The Jetty Preservation Society, formed in 1987, resorted to community fund-raising. By 2001, the Committee had raised just A$14,000 — a rate of A$1,000 per year.

1990s–present

In December 1999, a fire burnt 65 metres of jetty to the water-line incurring damage totaling $900,000.

A boatshed-style Interpretive Centre opened on the jetty in April 2001 and is located 50 m offshore. The Interpretive Centre gives visitors a glimpse into the jetty's past and its future.

In 2001, a new community-development Non-Government Organization (NGO), named "The Busselton Challenge", assisted the Committee in designing and executing a new fund-raising project that raised A$220,000 in just six months — 440 times the previous rate of fund-raising.

Further storm damage occurred in 2004, but the project continued. The jetty was re-positioned as an important state and national resource, enabling the Committee to attract funding for a A$27 million refurbishment project and enter the jetty into the State Register of Heritage Places, thereby securing its future. 

On 9 February 2006, the Queen's Baton Relay passed through Busselton. The baton was taken along the Busselton Jetty and then taken underwater by a scuba diver. The baton passed by the Underwater Observatory during its swim to allow the media to view the event.

In 2011 the refurbishment project was completed and the pier and railway were reopened to the public. In 2017 the train was replaced with a solar-powered electric vehicle. Federal government funding for a new discovery centre, along with a glasshouse village, was announced in 2019.

Attractions

Underwater observatory
The observatory was opened on 13 December 2003 at a cost of A$3.6 million.

In early 2021 it was announced that the underwater observatory would be replaced by the Australian Underwater Discovery Centre. The A$32 million facility, a semi-submerged four storey whale-shaped structure, will have a higher visitor capacity and contain larger viewing windows, a gallery, exhibition spaces and a marine research centre. To be constructed in Perth before being towed out to Busselton, the Australian Underwater Discovery Centre is expected to open in 2023. An accompanying "village" containing food and beverage outlets as well as spaces for weddings and corporate functions will also be built at the end of the jetty.

Memorial plaques 
Along one side of a section of the jetty are a number of memorial plaques, commemorating people whose ashes have been scattered from the jetty.

In February 2012 the Busselton Council limited the placement of such plaques to "exceptional circumstances", for people who had made significant contributions to or associated with the jetty.

Former attractions
In 1981, a waterslide opened adjacent to the landward end of the Busselton jetty. It was built wrapping around the existing lighthouse tower and was driven by pumped seawater. In 2011, the land which was occupied by the waterslide and associated amusement park attractions was re-purchased by the City of Busselton and the slide was shut down. The lighthouse was eventually demolished in 2015.

See also

 Port Germein, South Australia jetty, opened in 1881, extended to 1680 meters in 1883, reduced to 1532 meters, following storm damage.

Notes

External links

Piers in Australia
Coastline of Western Australia
Busselton
Tourist attractions in Western Australia
Transport buildings and structures in Western Australia
State Register of Heritage Places in the City of Busselton